Murder Among Friends is an American documentary television series on Investigation Discovery that debuted on April 19, 2016. The series examines murders in which a group of friends decide to kill one of their own. Murder Among Friends aired for two seasons.

Episodes

Season 1 (2016)

Season 2 (2017)

References

External links

2016 American television series debuts
English-language television shows
2010s American documentary television series
Investigation Discovery original programming
2017 American television series endings